Creaming is used to refer to several different culinary processes. In baking, it is the blending of ingredients with a softened form of a solid fat. When a dish is described as being "creamed", it may mean that it has been poached in milk,  cream or a similar liquid. "Creaming" can also refer to the separation of cream from milk.

Blending 

Creaming, in this sense, is the technique of softening solid fat, like shortening or butter, into a smooth mass and then blending it with other ingredients. The technique is most often used in making buttercream, cake batter or cookie dough. The dry ingredients are mixed or beaten with the softened fat until it becomes light and fluffy and increased in volume, due to the incorporation of tiny air bubbles. These air bubbles, locked into the semi-solid fat, remain in the final batter and expand as the item is baked, serving as a form of leavening agent.

Poaching 

Creamed food, in cooking,  denotes food that is prepared by slow simmering or poaching in milk or cream, such as creamed chipped beef on toast.

Some preparations of "creamed" food substitute water and a starch (often corn starch) for all or some of the milk or cream. This produces a "creamy" texture with no actual cream or milk used. Creamed corn uses only the liquid "milk" from mashed corn kernels.

In milk production

Creaming in milk production is the process by which cream rises to the top of un-homogenized milk. In this sense, the word is similar to the term "creaming" as it is used in chemistry.

References

 p 557.

Cooking techniques
Culinary terminology